The electoral ward of Aberavon electoral ward includes the communities of Baglan and Baglan Bay, in Neath Port Talbot county borough, Wales. Baglan falls within the parliamentary constituency of Aberavon.

Overview
It is based upon the historic town of Aberavon. Aberavon Ward is bounded by the wards of Sandfields West and Sandfields East to the south-west; Baglan to the north; Port Talbot to the east and Margam to the south. The ward boundaries are defined by the roads surrounding it: the M4 Motorway to the north east; the A4241 to the north-west; Afan Way to the south-west and the River Afan to the south-east.

The Aberavon Ward can be roughly divided into two parts. There is the residential area to the southeastern part of the ward beside the River Afan. The north western area consists of areas of industrial estate land called the Baglan Industrial Park which includes a number of out of town retail premises as well as business and manufacturing premises.

Aberavon is currently a ward for the purposes of Neath Port Talbot County Borough Council elections. Since 1995 it has been represented by Labour, Social Democrat and Plaid Cymru councillors.

County council elections

2020 by-election
Sitting Labour councillor, Steffan ap Dafydd, died suddenly on 10 July 2020. 

The by-election for his replacement took place on 6 May 2021, the turnout was 44.6% and the results were as follows:

2017
In the 2017 local council elections, the results were:

2012
In the 2012 local council elections, the electorate turnout for Aberavon was 35.84%.  The results were:

Following the election all three elected councillors left their respective parties and sat as unaffiliated councillors. Jones and Golding were deselected as candidates prior to the following May 2017 election, and decided to stand as Independents.

History 1889-1974
Aberavon first became an electoral ward in the late nineteenth century with the formation of Glamorgan County Council.

Glamorgan County Council, 1889-1974
In 1889, Richard Jenkins, a local tinplate manufacturer became the first Liberal member for Aberavon, defeating John Morgan Smith. 

Following Jenkins's elevation to the aldermanic bench, Smith won the seat.

Smith held the seat at the elections of 1892, 1895, 1898, 1901, 1904 and 1907.

Aberavon Borough Council
Aberavon was also an electoral ward of the Aberavon Borough Council which was reformed and extended in 1861. In 1921, the old borough was merged with Margam Urban District Council, formed in 1894 to create the Port Talbot Municipal Borough.

References

Electoral wards of Neath Port Talbot